Cheryl Beer is an author, folk singer and multi-media artist. She is included among the 100+ Menywod Cymraeg/Welsh Women who have made a significant contribution to national life.

Career
Beer has been a folksinger since childhood, appearing as a solo singer or as part of group from the 1990s onwards. Her albums include  Just Another Judas (1997), Little Fish: Bare Bone Songs (2001) that was distributed by HMV records, Easy Street (2016).
She has worked with several organisations in Wales. She supports the benefits of the arts for health. In 2008 she was the song consultant to Festival of Four, a community festival across Merthyr Tydfil, Blaenau Gwent, Torfaen & Caerphilly led by the Welsh community arts organisation Head4Arts. In 2014 she was the founder of a dementia-friendly online radio programme Sound Memories Radio.

In 2017 her own hearing became impaired but this led her to develop new music and art recording and using the sounds from the sea and within trees and the analyses of their sound spectra. In 2022 she completed Cân y coed/Rainforest symphony, making use of sounds recorded from the mosses, trees and other plants of the Celtic rain forest in Wales. It was premiered at the National Botanic Garden of Wales and subsequently performed at other events such as the annual Unlimited Festival at the Southbank Centre in London in September 2022.

Honours and awards
Beer has been included in the list of 100+MenywodCymreig-WelshWomen'' for her contribution to national life.

References

Living people
Date of birth missing (living people)
Welsh singer-songwriters
British women singer-songwriters
20th-century Welsh singers
20th-century Welsh women singers
21st-century Welsh singers
21st-century Welsh women singers
Year of birth missing (living people)